The Sword Dance is a 19th-century painting series by the Polish painter Henryk Siemiradzki. It is also known as Dance Amongst Daggers and Dance Amongst Swords, among other names.

Description
The paintings all depict a nude woman who dances between swords that are placed on the ground, while a group of women play music and a few men watch. The setting is Italian, and there have been several interpretations of what exactly the painting depicts.

Variations
Siemiradzki made four versions, each with a slightly different composition and colour scheme. One of the versions, originally commissioned by K. T. Soldatenkov, is located at the Tretyakov Gallery in Moscow. Another version was sold at auction in 2011 for 2,098,500 dollars, which was the new record for a Siemiradzki painting. The record was held until 2013, when Un naufragé mendiant was sold for 1,082,500 Pound sterling. All are painted with oil paint on canvas.

Galler

References

External links
 Dance amongst Daggers at the Tretyakov Gallery's website

1881 paintings
Collections of the Tretyakov Gallery
Dance in art
Paintings by Henryk Siemiradzki
Musical instruments in art